Mithridates V ( Mihrdāt) was a Parthian contender from 129 to 140. His son, Vologases IV of Parthia (147–191), took the throne after the death of Vologases III in 147.

Sources 
 
  (2 volumes)

140 deaths
2nd-century Parthian monarchs
Year of birth unknown
2nd-century Iranian people